Charles Francis Kenny (June 23, 1898 – January 20, 1992) was an American composer, lyricist, author, and violinist. His hit songs include "There's a Gold Mine in the Sky", "Love Letters in the Sand", "Laughing at Life", and "Because It's Your Birthday Today", all of which were written with his brother Nick Kenny. The birthday song appeared in the Our Gang episode Practical Jokers.

Songs
"There's a Gold Mine in the Sky" was published in 1937.  It charted at No. 1 on Billboard's "Sheet-Music Leaders" chart for the week ending February 5, 1938.  The song was recorded by Gene Autry (OKeh 03358) and appeared in his 1938 film Gold Mine in the Sky.  The song also was recorded by Jimmie Davis (Decca 5473), Pat Boone (Dot 15602), Art Kassel (Bluebird B-7257), Johnny Pfander (Damon D-12223), Bing Crosby (on November 12, 1937 - Decca 2678)  (see Crosby's Cowboy Songs album) and Kate Smith.

External Link

References

American male composers
Songwriters from New York (state)
American male violinists
1898 births
1992 deaths
20th-century American violinists
20th-century American writers
People from Astoria, Queens
20th-century American male writers
20th-century American composers
20th-century American male musicians
American male songwriters